Mombin (also Romanized as Mombīn, Mom Bayn, and Mombeyn; also known as Mon Bayn) is a village in Susan-e Sharqi Rural District, Susan District, Izeh County, Khuzestan Province, Iran. At the 2006 census, its population was 854, in 141 families.

References 

Populated places in Izeh County